Since 1887, two of the oldest public schools in the United States, the Boston Latin School and English High School of Boston, have faced off in an annual football competition which now takes place on Thanksgiving day at Harvard Stadium. The rivalry had been the longest-running continuous high school football rivalry in the U.S, until the streak was broken in the 2020 season; the game was played every year, even during World War I, the Spanish flu, and World War II, but high school football was banned in Massachusetts in 2020 as a reaction to the COVID-19 pandemic in Massachusetts. It remains the fifth longest all time behind Phillips Academy versus Phillips Exeter Academy; Wellesley, Massachusetts versus Needham, Massachusetts; New London, Connecticut versus Norwich Free Academy in Norwich, Connecticut; Germantown Academy vs. William Penn Charter School; and Lawrenceville School vs. The Hill School.

Stats
The series began with both teams' formation in 1887. Prior to 1887, English and Latin had fielded a unified team.

Until the late 1960s, the rivalry was fairly even. Since that time, Latin has dominated the series, leading all time 83–39–13, and winning 52 of the last 58 contests (1964-2022). Latin's dominance could be considered at its zenith in the 1970s when they held English to only 28 points for the entire decade.

Ten of the games ended in scoreless ties, a rare feat in modern Football at any level, although the last instance of this came in 1945. The implementation of overtime has dramatically reduced the number of tie games throughout the game of football.

Much of the series has been decided in blowout victories by one side or the other, with 63 of the 134 games being decided by shutouts and 39 of the contests ending in 20-point or more victories.

Game results

See also
Lists of high school football rivalries

References

1887 establishments in Massachusetts
American football in Boston
High school football in the United States
High school sports rivalries in the United States
Recurring sporting events established in 1887
Thanksgiving (United States)